Robert Cryder (born September 7, 1956) is a former American football offensive guard who played in the NFL from 1978–1986. Cryder currently resides in Quincy, Washington. He played college football for the University of Alabama.

References

1956 births
Living people
American football offensive linemen
Alabama Crimson Tide football players
University of Alabama alumni
New England Patriots players
Seattle Seahawks players
People from East St. Louis, Illinois